Jacob Hauser-Ramsey (born August 4, 1995) is a former American soccer player.

Career

College & Youth
Hauser-Ramsey played fours years of college soccer, beginning at Tyler Junior College, before transferring to the University of Connecticut in 2015.

While at college, Hauser-Ramsey also appeared for USL PDL sides Seattle Sounders FC U-23 and Myrtle Beach Mutiny.

Professional
On January 11, 2019, Hauser-Ramsey was selected 42nd overall in the 2019 MLS SuperDraft by Colorado Rapids.

On March 21, 2019, Hauser-Ramsey joined USL Championship side Memphis 901 ahead of their inaugural season.

Hauser-Ramsey joined USL Championship side Portland Timbers 2 on March 5, 2020.

On September 9, 2020, Hauser-Ramsey returned to Memphis 901 for the remainder of the 2020 season.

References

External links 
 Connecticut Huskies Profile
 
 USL Profile

1995 births
Living people
American soccer players
Association football defenders
Colorado Rapids draft picks
UConn Huskies men's soccer players
Memphis 901 FC players
Myrtle Beach Mutiny players
Portland Timbers 2 players
Seattle Sounders FC U-23 players
Soccer players from Seattle
USL Championship players
USL League Two players